From February 20 to July 1, 1984, voters of the Republican Party chose its nominee for president in the 1984 United States presidential election. Incumbent President Ronald Reagan was again selected as the nominee through a series of primary elections and caucuses culminating in the 1984 Republican National Convention held from August 20 to August 23, 1984, in Dallas, Texas.

The primaries were uneventful as Reagan was virtually assured of the nomination by virtue of his popularity within the party. Thus, he faced only token opposition in the primary race.

Candidates

Nominee

Withdrew during primaries

Results
The popular vote from the Republican primaries was as follows:
 Ronald Reagan (inc.): 6,484,987 (98.78%)
 Unpledged delegates: 55,458 (0.85%)
 Harold Stassen: 12,749 (0.19%)
 Ben Fernandez: 202 (0.00%)

Reagan was renominated by a vote of 2,233 (two delegates abstained). For the only time in American history, the vice presidential roll call was taken concurrently with the presidential roll call. Vice President George H. W. Bush was overwhelmingly renominated. This was the last time in the 20th century that the vice presidential candidate of either major party was nominated by roll call vote.

See also
1984 Democratic Party presidential primaries

References